The Malaysian Rubber Board (MRB) is the custodian of the rubber industry in Malaysia. Established on 1 January 1998, it has under its fold three agencies (RRIM, MRRDB and MRELB), which are now merged into one. The R&D work in natural rubber, accomplished by the Rubber Research Institute of Malaysia, has been used by the Malaysian natural rubber industry and other NR producing countries.

The objective of MRB is to assist in the development and modernization of the Malaysian rubber industry from cultivation of the rubber tree, the extraction and processing of its raw rubber, the manufacture of rubber products and the marketing of rubber and rubber products.

The Director General of MRB is Dato' Dr Zairossani Mohd Nor.

External links
 The Malaysian Rubber Board

Federal ministries, departments and agencies of Malaysia
Rubber industry in Malaysia
1998 establishments in Malaysia
Government agencies established in 1998
Ministry of Primary Industries (Malaysia)